"Nobody Told Me" is a song by John Lennon. The B-side features Yoko Ono's "O' Sanity"; both are on the Milk and Honey album. The promo video for the single was made up of clips of footage from Lennon's other videos, as are most posthumous Lennon videos.

Writing
The lyrics reference the yellow idol in J. Milton Hayes' poem The Green Eye of the Yellow God. The first stanza of the poem runs: "There's a one-eyed yellow idol to the north of Kathmandu."

Another line in the song is "There's UFOs over New York and I ain't too surprised". In the liner notes to his 1974 album Walls and Bridges, Lennon wrote: "On the 23rd August 1974 at 9 o'clock I saw a U.F.O. – J.L." May Pang, John's lover at the time, claimed that Lennon said "come back - take me!" upon seeing the unidentified flying object.

The lines "Nobody told me there'd be days like these / Strange days indeed / Most peculiar, mama" are in contrast to the old adage "My mother told me there'd be days like this."

Yoko Ono called the track "kind of a fun song." She told Uncut in 1998: "I think that especially around that time he felt that again, the world had lost its course, its direction. I really think that it's to do with, not confusion but starting to learn that life is always gonna be a mystery."

Recording
Recorded but left incomplete shortly before his death in 1980, the song was later completed by Lennon's widow Yoko Ono in 1983 and released as the first single from Lennon and Ono's album Milk and Honey in 1984. The song was later released in the UK in 1990 with "I'm Stepping Out" on the B-side.  The song was originally written for Ringo Starr to include on his 1981 album, Stop and Smell the Roses, but due to Lennon's death, Starr decided not to record it.

A promo video for "Nobody Told Me" was compiled in 2003 for the DVD Lennon Legend: The Very Best of John Lennon, featuring Lennon and Ono in archival footage from the early 1970s. The majority of the video's content was edited from newly transferred footage and out-takes from Lennon and Ono's 1972 film Imagine. Also featured in the music video are Phil Spector, George Harrison, Dick Cavett, Fred Astaire, Andy Warhol and Miles Davis.

Reception
Cash Box said that "a melodic cross between 'Just Like Starting Over' and 'Instant Karma', the song begins with a hearty 'one-two-three-four' and launches into an inspiring, sentimental and memorable ode to the world, the human race, and Lennon's own consciousness."

Personnel
John Lennon – vocals, rhythm guitar
Earl Slick, Hugh McCracken – lead guitar
Tony Levin – bass
George Small – keyboards
Andy Newmark – drums
Arthur Jenkins – percussion

Chart performance
"Nobody Told Me" was Lennon's last new single to reach the UK top 10, peaking at number 6 (although a reissue of "Imagine" reached number 3 in December 1999). The single was also Lennon's last US top 10 hit, peaking at number 5 on the Billboard Hot 100 and number 6 on the Cashbox Top 100, and was his third single to enter the US top 10 posthumously.

Cover versions
The Flaming Lips recorded a version for the 1995 John Lennon tribute album Working Class Hero: A Tribute to John Lennon.
The benefit album Instant Karma: The Amnesty International Campaign to Save Darfur contained a version by Big & Rich.

Charts

Weekly charts

Year-end charts

References

External links
[ Milk and Honey] at Allmusic.
Walls and Bridges discography on JPGR
 

1984 singles
John Lennon songs
Songs released posthumously
Songs written by John Lennon
Song recordings produced by John Lennon
Song recordings produced by Yoko Ono
Songs about extraterrestrial life
Polydor Records singles
1984 songs